Clydebank railway station is a railway station serving the town of Clydebank in West Dunbartonshire, Scotland. It is located on the Argyle Line and the North Clyde Line. Passenger services are operated by ScotRail.

History 
It replaced the original GY&CR Clydebank terminus, which was then renamed Clydebank East (closed in 1959).

Services

2008 
The station is staffed part-time and has two platforms on a high level. It is served by 4 to 6 trains per hour:

  to 
 Dalmuir to  via Glasgow Central Low level
 Dalmuir to  via Glasgow Queen Street Low level

2013

The basic daytime weekday service from the station is 4 trains per hour each way (15 minute intervals). Westbound, all services terminate at Dalmuir. In the evenings, the frequency drops to half-hourly but trains run through to Edinburgh via Queen St L.L and  eastbound and to Helensburgh Central westbound.

On Sundays, the service is half-hourly each way to Balloch & Motherwell.

2016

This frequency now operates throughout the day until end of service. The Sunday service to Balloch is still half hourly but southeastbound trains now run alternately either to Motherwell via  or Larkhall.

References

Notes

Sources 

 
 
 

Railway stations in West Dunbartonshire
Former North British Railway stations
Railway stations in Great Britain opened in 1897
Railway stations in Great Britain closed in 1917
Railway stations in Great Britain opened in 1919
SPT railway stations
Railway stations served by ScotRail
Clydebank